Franz Suhrada (born 26 June 1954) is an Austrian actor.

Life and career 
In 1976, he gave up his original profession and became a full-time actor. Various engagements as a theatre actor took him to Salzburg, Berlin, Hamburg, Prague, Dessau and Leipzig, among other places.

He became known to Austrian television audiences primarily through his role as policeman Schreyvogel in the ORF TV series Kottan ermittelt. He also appeared in the series Tohuwabohu, Ein echter Wiener geht nicht unter and Die Alpensaga. In the series Cafe Lotto, he played a waiter for 13 years.

He also does voice-overs for commercials and audio books. Among the audio books he has narrated are Wiener Schmankerln and two Kottan episodes published as audio books (Hartlgasse 16a and Der Geburtstag). In 2010, he appeared in the feature film .

TV serials 
 1978: Die Alpensaga
 1978–1983: Kottan ermittelt
 1986: Tatort: Tatort: Der Tod des Tänzers
 1988: Der Leihopa
 1993: Die Leute von St. Benedikt
 1994: Tohuwabohu
 1996: Spiel des Lebens
 2006: SOKO Donau

Further reading 
 Club Carriere – Enzyklopädie des Erfolges 1998, Seite 714 f., Algoprint Verlags AG, Vaduz

References

External links 
 
 
 
 Vereinigte Bühnen Bozen – Franz Suhrada

Austrian male film actors
Austrian male stage actors
1954 births
living people
Male actors from Vienna